Ek Mahanayak – Dr. B.R. Ambedkar is an Indian Hindi-language drama series produced by Sobo Films. It premiered on 17 December 2019 on And TV with Ayudh Bhanushali as five-year-old Bhimrao. In 2021, the story moved on several years and Atharva Karve was introduced as young B. R. Ambedkar.

Cast

Main 
 Aayudh Bhanushali as five-year-old Ambedkar / Bhimrao / Bheem
 Atharva Karve as adult/young Bhimrao Ambedkar
 Prasad Jawade as Bhimrao Ramji Ambedkar

Supporting 
 Jagannath Nivangune as Ramji Maloji Sakpal: Bhimrao's father
 Narayani Mahesh Varne as Ramabai Bhimrao Ambedkar
 Neha Joshi as Bhimabai Sakpal: Bhimrao's mother
 Vikram Dwivedi as Narottam Joshi: Bhimrao's Rival
 Saud Mansuri as Raju Rao: Bhimrao's brother
 Athar Khan as Aanand Rao: Bhimrao's brother
 Vanshika Yadav as Manjula: Bhimrao's sister
 Sapna Devalkar as Ganga: Bhimrao's sister
 Falguni Dave as Mira: Bhimrao's paternal aunt
 Amit Pandey as Purushottam
 Naman Arora as Mahesh ( Bheem's Jija ji & Manjula's Husband)
 Parma Gutte as a villager
 Ashif Syed as a villager
 Tarlok Singh 
 Suresh Panwar as Janardan

Production

Casting 
In July 2021, it was announced that show will take a leap. Atharva Karve and Narayani Mahesh Varne were introduced as Dr. B.R. Ambedkar and Ramabai Bhimrao Ambedkar respectively.

Dubbed versions

References 

2019 Indian television series debuts
Hindi-language television shows
&TV original programming
Cultural depictions of B. R. Ambedkar
Indian drama television series
Television shows set in the British Raj
Indian historical television series
Indian independence movement fiction
Indian period television series
Indian political television series